Darren Quinton (born 28 April 1986) was an English footballer who played as a midfielder for St Albans City.

Career
He joined Cambridge United's youth scheme at the age of 16, after leaving Ipswich Town's youth academy.

As a youth scholar in September 2003, he was loaned to Welling United where he made two appearances. He made his Cambridge United debut on 8 May 2004, the final match of the League Two season against Leyton Orient. He joined Braintree Town in March 2009, the club where his cousin Brad Quinton was captain.

He now works full-time in London and has moved back to his home in Essex.

References

External links

1986 births
Living people
Footballers from Romford
English footballers
Association football midfielders
Cambridge United F.C. players
Welling United F.C. players
Braintree Town F.C. players
St Albans City F.C. players
English Football League players
National League (English football) players